Guido Emanuel Villar (born 15 February 1998) is an Argentine professional footballer who plays as a goalkeeper for Olimpo.

Club career
Villar's senior career got underway with Olimpo, after a youth stint with them, Villa Delfina (between 2006 and 2007) and Bella Vista. He was put into the first-team of the Primera División club in 2016–17, but didn't make his debut until 2017–18 when he marked it with a ninety-minute appearance against San Lorenzo at the Estadio Pedro Bidegain on 17 March 2018; on the way to four appearances as Olimpo suffered relegation.

International career
Villar was called up to train with the Argentina U17s in 2014.

Career statistics
.

References

External links

1998 births
Living people
Sportspeople from Bahía Blanca
Argentine footballers
Association football goalkeepers
Argentine Primera División players
Olimpo footballers